Olin Caprison, better known as Violence (stylized VIOLENCE), is an American experimental musician, composer, performance artist, and producer.

Life and career

Caprison was not seriously interested in performance while growing up in Baltimore, but began experimenting with making music while learning to edit video. They began recording and performing as Violence in 2010.

The first Violence release was REPTILE/Hand Me Downs from Heaven (Steak Au Zoo Records, 2012). In 2016, artist collective NON released Violence's A Ruse of Power, and the following year artist collective PTP (aka Purple Tape Pedigree) released Human Dust to Fertilize the Impotent Garden.

Violence has toured with Mykki Blanco and Yves Tumor, performed at the Brooklyn Museum, and was a 2019 MacDowell fellow in music composition.

Discography

Albums
 REPTILE/Hand Me Downs from Heaven (Steak au Zoo Records, 2012)
 A Ruse of Power (NON Worldwide, 2016)
 Human Dust to Fertilize the Impotent Garden (PTP, 2017)

Singles 
 "This is Going to be Disgusting, Unholy, and Pleasurable" (Dogfood Music Group, 2015)
 "Wintertime" (NON, 2015)
 "Psycud" (NON, 2016)
 "Rain" (NON, 2016)

Scores 
 Kandis William's Affect:Network:Territory (Performed multiple times throughout 2016)
 Richard Kennedy's Both (2017)
 Richard Kennedy's HIR (2019)

Compilations 
 Blasting Voice (Teenage Teardrops, 2012)
 Mykki Blanco Presents: C-ORE (Dogfood Music Group, 2015)

References 

American electronic musicians
MacDowell Colony fellows